Xysticus obscurus is a species of crab spider in the family Thomisidae. It is found in North America, Europe, and a range from Russia (European to Sibiria).

References

Thomisidae
Articles created by Qbugbot
Spiders described in 1877
Spiders of North America
Spiders of Europe
Spiders of Russia